Korbinian Brodmann (17 November 1868 – 22 August 1918) was a German neurologist who became famous for mapping the cerebral cortex and defining 52 distinct regions, known as Brodmann areas, based on their cytoarchitectonic (histological) characteristics.

Life and career 
Brodmann was born in Liggersdorf, Province of Hohenzollern. He studied medicine in Munich, Würzburg, Berlin, and Freiburg, where he received his medical diploma in 1895. Subsequently he studied at the Medical School in the University of Lausanne in Switzerland, and then worked in the University Clinic in Munich. He received a doctor of medicine degree from the University of Leipzig in 1898, with a thesis on chronic ependymal sclerosis. From 1900 to 1901, Brodmann also worked in the Psychiatric Clinic at the University of Jena, with Ludwig Binswanger, and in the Municipal Mental Asylum in Frankfurt. There, he met Alois Alzheimer, who was influential in his decision to pursue basic neuroscience research.

Following this, Brodmann started to work in 1901 with Cécile and Oskar Vogt at the private institute Neurobiologische Zentralstation in Berlin, and in 1902 in the Neurobiological Laboratory of the University of Berlin. In 1915 he joined the Kaiser-Wilhelm-Institut für Hirnforschung, now known as the Max Planck Institute for Brain Research.

In 1909, Brodmann published his original research on cortical cytoarchitectonics in the monograph Vergleichende Lokalisationslehre der Großhirnrinde (Localisation in the cerebral cortex). Famously, this book contained the first map of the cerebral cortex based on regional variations in structure. These regions would later become known as Brodmann areas.

After completing his work in Berlin, Brodmann joined the University of Tübingen. There, he was habilitated and made a full professor in 1913. From 1910 to 1916, he served as physician and chairman of the Anatomical Laboratory at the University Psychiatric Clinic. Brodmann moved to Halle in 1916 to work in the Nietleben Municipal Hospital. Finally, in 1918, he accepted an invitation from the University of Munich to direct the group of histology at Psychiatric Research Center.

Brodmann died in Munich rather suddenly of a generalized septic infection following pneumonia, at just under 50 years of age on 22 August 1918.

Brodmann areas 

The cortical areas that Brodmann described and located are now usually referred to as Brodmann areas. There are a total of 52 areas grouped into 11 histological areas. Brodmann used a variety of criteria to map the human brain, including attention to both gross anatomical features and cortical micro-structures. Brodmann postulated that areas with different structures performed different functions. Indeed, some of these areas were later associated to nervous functions, such as the following:
 Brodmann area 41 and 42 in the temporal lobe, related to hearing
 Brodmann area 45 and 44 overlap with the Broca's area for language in humans
 Brodmann area 1, 2, and 3 in the postcentral gyrus of the parietal lobe (the somatosensory region)
 Brodmann area 4 in the precentral gyrus of the frontal lobe (the primary motor area)
 Brodmann area 17 and 18 in the occipital lobe (the primary visual areas).

His work to characterize brain cytoarchitecture was strongly influenced by Oskar Vogt, who postulated over 200 distinct areas in the brain.

References

External links

 Korbinian Brodmann (1868-1918) article by Professor Laurence Garey
 microscope for brain sections from the University of Tübingen (1911), attributed to Korbinian Brodmann's work (German language)
 Korbinian Brodmann WhoNamedIt

1868 births
1918 deaths
People from Konstanz (district)
German neurologists
German neuroscientists
History of neuroscience
Deaths from sepsis
People from the Province of Hohenzollern
Ludwig Maximilian University of Munich alumni
Academic staff of the Ludwig Maximilian University of Munich
University of Würzburg alumni
Humboldt University of Berlin alumni
University of Freiburg alumni
Leipzig University alumni
Academic staff of the University of Tübingen
Deaths from pneumonia in Germany